"He's a Rebel" is a song written by Gene Pitney that was originally recorded by Vikki Carr and by the girl group the Blossoms. Produced by Phil Spector, the Blossoms' version was issued as a single credited to the Crystals, which topped the Billboard Hot 100 chart in November 1962. It was Spector's second chart-topper after  "To Know Him Is to Love Him" (1958).

In 2004, "He's a Rebel" was ranked No. 263 on Rolling Stone's 500 Greatest Songs of All Time. Billboard named the song No. 31 on its list of 100 Greatest Girl Group Songs of All Time.

History
The song is about a girl in love with a young man who spurns society's conventions. Despite his being misunderstood by others, the singer claims he is sweet and faithful and vows to be the same towards him. Steve Douglas performs a saxophone solo during the song's bridge. The piano riff at the beginning was contributed by Al DeLory.

Pitney wrote "He's a Rebel" for The Shirelles, but they declined. Spector learned Vikki Carr was to record it for Liberty Records as her debut, and wanted his own version on sale first. The Crystals were touring on the east coast of the US at the time, so Spector had The Blossoms, a Los Angeles group, record the track with the agreement that the record would still be credited to the Crystals. Mary Thomas of the Crystals recalled that "our mouths fell open" when she and her groupmates heard a disc jockey announce "the new Crystals song." The quintet was then obliged to add "He's a Rebel" to their live repertoire, even though lead singer Barbara Alston could not mimic Blossoms lead singer Darlene Love. For that reason, 15-year-old Dolores "LaLa" Brooks became the lead singer the following year with the follow-up "Then He Kissed Me".

"He's a Rebel" was released in late August 1962, with the B-side "I Love You Eddie." On November 3, "He's a Rebel" reached No. 1 on the Billboard Hot 100 chart. The number two song was Pitney's "Only Love Can Break a Heart", giving him (as a songwriter or performer) the two top-selling singles in the U.S. In the United Kingdom, "He's a Rebel" peaked at No. 19.

The song and its recording was featured in a fictionalized recreation in the 2018 movie Bad Times at the El Royale. The character of Darleen Sweet was based on singer Darlene Love and the character Buddy Sunday was meant to represent producer Phil Spector.

Personnel
 Lead Vocals – Darlene Love, Edna Wright (co-lead during chorus)
 Backing Vocals – Edna Wright, Fanita James, Gracia Nitzsche, Gloria Jones, Jean King and Bobby Sheen
 Hal Blaine drums
Steve Douglas, saxophone
Howard Roberts guitar
 Tommy Tedesco guitar
 Al DeLory piano
 Don Randi piano
 Jimmy Bond upright bass
 Ray Pohlman bass guitar
 The July 1962 session was arranged by Jack Nitzsche and engineered by Larry Levine.

Chart history

Weekly charts

Year-end charts

Other versions
Vikki Carr's version was performed with a band that included sometime Wrecking Crew drummer Earl Palmer. Because Spector preempted the release with his version, her version reached No. 115 in the US, but in Australia her version reached No. 5 in 1962.

Alisha's Attic's Version realised in 1997 as part of the bean the movie soundtrack.

References

External links
 

1962 songs
1962 singles
The Crystals songs
Billboard Hot 100 number-one singles
Number-one singles in Canada
Number-one singles in New Zealand
Songs written by Gene Pitney
Song recordings produced by Phil Spector
Song recordings with Wall of Sound arrangements
Vikki Carr songs
Philles Records singles